Lili Haydn (born December 25, 1969) is a Canadian-born rock violinist, vocalist, actress, and composer. As a child, she pursued a career as an actress; at age eight she discovered the violin and began to focus on classical music. By the time Haydn was 15, she had played with the Los Angeles Philharmonic.

After graduating from Brown University with a BA in political science, Haydn started composing original songs and became one of the most requested session violinists around Los Angeles. By the time she signed with Atlantic in 1997, she had embraced a variety of genres, having played with Quwaali musician Nusrat Fateh Ali Khan, Porno for Pyros, Tracy Chapman, The Jayhawks, Brandy, Tony! Toni! Tone!, No Doubt, Tom Petty and more. In addition, she has played with, sung with, and opened for Sting, Josh Groban, Herbie Hancock, Jimmy Page and Robert Plant, Matchbox 20, Seal, and George Clinton, who calls her "the Jimi Hendrix of the violin".

Early life
Haydn was born in Toronto, Ontario, Canada. She is the daughter of comedian Lotus Weinstock and video artist David Jove, who was one of the first people to mass-produce LSD. Haydn's parents allowed her to choose her own first name. She reportedly chose the name "Helicopter" by which she was known briefly.

When she was three years old, Haydn and her mother moved to the United States. For a time, they lived at the Brotherhood of the Source, a commune in the Hollywood Hills led by Father Yod. Haydn's father eventually rescued the two from the commune cult.

Career

Acting
Haydn began her career as a child actress at the age of seven. She initially appeared in commercials and moved on to television and film roles. From 1979 to 1980, she played Jenny Columbo, daughter of Lt. Columbo and his ex-wife, Kate Columbo/Callahan (Kate Mulgrew) in the Columbo spin-off series Mrs. Columbo. In 1983, she starred as Belinda Capuletti, the smart and sassy daughter of Rodney Dangerfield's character in the comedy film Easy Money. She also appeared in the first Not Quite Human TV movie in 1987, and was a regular cast member on the syndicated sitcom The New Gidget.

She has a bit part in the Michael Keaton movie Jack Frost for which Trevor Rabin composed the score.

Music
Haydn began playing the violin at the age of eight. She played her first professional gig in 1990. In 1992, Haydn graduated from Brown University with a BA in political science and began to pursue a career in music. Her debut album, Lili, was released in the fall of 1997. Following the album's release, she toured as an opening act for Jimmy Page and Robert Plant's 1998 tour of North America. Her second album, Light Blue Sun, was released in 2003, followed by 2008's Place Between Places, which she promoted with television and radio appearances such as The Tonight Show with Jay Leno, and NPR. NPR described "Place Between Places" as "A mix of neo-psychedelic flower child and rock star virtuoso...Heifetz meet Hendrix." She contributed to the score of the Edward Burns/Jennifer Aniston film She's the One (1996), as well as several films with Hans Zimmer, including Disney's Pirates of the Caribbean: At World's End.

Haydn won a fellowship to the Sundance Film Institute composing in 2009, and has composed the film scores for three films,  Jacklight, The Horse Boy (premiered at Sundance Film Festival and released in 2009 by Zeitgeist Films), and "The Lightmaker".

In 2008, Haydn accompanied Roger Waters at the Coachella music festival when they played "The Dark Side of the Moon". Haydn also performed on Cyndi Lauper's True Colors Tour 2008. That same year she appeared on the cable TV series, Californication. In 2009, Haydn sustained neurological damage after being exposed to the pesticide Chlordane. While she was unable to write lyrics, she was still able to compose music. For the five years, she continued working on film scores and composed music for her fourth album, Lililand, released in September 2014.
Since the release of "Lilliland" in 2014, Haydn has scored seven films, including Academy Award winner Freida Mock's "Anita", "The House that Jack Built", and Sundance Selects' "Driver X." She has also worked on the score for Seasons 2 and 3 of the Emmy winning series "Transparent" and done four high-impact TED presentations.

In 2018, Haydn joined with musicians Hamid Saeidi, MB Gordy, and Itai Disraeli to create the group Opium Moon. Their eponymous album was awarded a Grammy in the category of Best New Age Album.

In 2021, Haydn released a new single, "Sayonara", and has been working on scoring a number of TV and film projects, including the feature documentary "Strip Down, Rise Up" by Oscar nominated director Michele Ohayon and Freida Mock's latest documentary, "RUTH: Justice Ginsburg in Her Own Words."

Activism
A social activist, Haydn also performs regularly for various human rights organizations, including Amnesty International, Operation USA, Human Rights Watch, Human Rights Action Center. Her song "Unfolding Grace" appears on a CD compilation with U2 and Sting which benefits Aung San Suu Kyi and the Burmese pro-democracy movement.

Discography
Lili (1997) Atlantic Records
Light Blue Sun (2003) BMG/Private Music
 Goodbye Stranger Ep (2007) Nettwerk Music Group
 Place Between Places (2008) Nettwerk Music Group
 Lililand (2014)
 Evocations (2015) New Gold Music
 Opium Moon (2018) Be Why Records
 More Love (2021) Lakeshore Records

References

External links

 
 

1969 births
Living people
20th-century Canadian actresses
21st-century Canadian actresses
Actresses from Los Angeles
Actresses from Toronto
Arista Records artists
Atlantic Records artists
Brown University alumni
Canadian child actresses
Canadian expatriate actresses in the United States
Canadian film actresses
Canadian film score composers
Canadian jazz violinists
Canadian session musicians
Canadian television actresses
Musicians from Los Angeles
Musicians from Toronto
21st-century Canadian violinists and fiddlers
Canadian women composers